Omero Tognon (3 March 1924 – 23 August 1990) was an Italian footballer who played as a central midfielder. He was mainly known for his physical power and his exemplary correct behaviour on the pitch, and never once received a caution during his eleven-year spell with Milan.

Club career
Born in Padua, Tognon was a  central midfielder who played for Milan during the 1940s and 1950s. Tognon played eleven seasons with Milan making 335 appearances preceded only by Gianni Rivera, Paolo Maldini, Franco Baresi, Billy Costacurta, Mauro Tassotti, Nils Liedholm and Cesare Maldini. He formed a  tandem in midfield with Carlo Annovazzi. With Milan he won two championships, the first in 1951 having played 37 of 38 games, and the second in 1955 without playing any games; he served as the club's captain between 1953 and 1956. He later also spent a season with Pordenone before retiring in 1957.

International career
Tognon was selected to the national team for the 1950 World Cup but, along with Emilio Caprile, Giuseppe Casari and Benito Lorenzi, he saw no action at the tournament. He would get another opportunity at the 1954 World Cup where he was immovable at in the centre of the team's defence. The second game against Switzerland was his last cap for the 'Azzurri'.

Honours

Player
Milan
Serie A: 1950–51, 1954–55
Coppa Latina: 1951, 1956

Manager
Arezzo
Serie C: 1968–69

Individual
A.C. Milan Hall of Fame

References

External links
Profile at FIGC 
Profile at enciclopediadelcalcio.it 

1924 births
1990 deaths
Sportspeople from Padua
Italian footballers
Association football midfielders
A.C. Milan players
Serie A players
Italy international footballers
1950 FIFA World Cup players
1954 FIFA World Cup players
Italian football managers
Hellas Verona F.C. managers
Footballers from Veneto